Devonport Services Rugby Football Club is an English rugby union team based in Plymouth, Devon.  The club was originally called United Services Devonport and had their first recorded match back in 1904. Devonport Services play their homes games at the Rectory Field and their strip and club colours are dark blue and red.  They are currently competing in  Regional 1 Tribute South West of the English rugby union league system following their promotion from South West 1 via the play-offs. At the end of season 2021/22 they were 2nd in the league and thus were promoted to South West Premier.

Current club 
Once open to the members of the British Armed Forces only, the rules were relaxed in 1994 when the youth teams joined the club, therefore allowing civilians to play alongside serving armed forces players.  However, the club rules stipulate that at least 50% of the club's senior squad playing must be members of the Armed Forces - mainly from the Royal Navy and Royal Marines.  As well as first team the club runs 2nd and 3rd teams, colts, and the occasional Vets team.  There are also multiple youth teams for boys (7-16) and girls (15-18).

Club history

Early beginnings 
Although the beginnings of the club are hazy they were certainly established during the first decade of the 20th century.  The team, then known as United Services Devonport, was initially open to officers of the British Armed Forces, with the first recorded match being on 1 October 1904 when Services played out a 2–2 draw against Plymouth RFC (a parent club of Plymouth Albion) in front of a crowd of 6,000.  During the early stages of the club the team did not perform particularly well until 1912 when the club opened its playing membership to other ranks in the military and results improved dramatically.

The first mention of the club using the current name of Devonport Services with any regularity was around 1910/1911, although occasionally the press covering games would call them United Services leading to a degree of confusion.  In 1912 the club got given its nickname "The Sporting Blues" by the South Wales Echo who used this name as part of their headline when covering the Services game away to Swansea.  The Services initially played home games at Keyham, owned by the RNEC but during 1920s they moved to the Rectory Field in Devonport.  The Rectory Field had previously been occupied by Devonport Albion, who were the strongest side in Devon during the early 20th century, but the ground was sold for £6,500 to the Navy in 1920.  In the same year Devonport Albion merged with Plymouth RFC to form Plymouth Albion and subsequently moved to Beacon Park.  In 1928 the Rectory Field was procured by the Royal Navy and Royal Marines Sports Control Board who rented it out to Devonport Services who have remained there ever since.

Postwar years
During World War II the Rectory Field was destroyed by fire due to Luftwaffe bombing raids, leaving only a small section of stand considered safe enough for spectators.  The post war years would see the Rectory Field rebuilt, leaving Devonport Services without a home ground for several years.  By 1948 the damaged main stand was rebuilt and space for around 1,200 supporters, while additional facilities such as separate changing rooms and a bar were added and a second stand was also added - leading to the ground becoming known as the “Twickenham of the West”.  After being rebuilt the Rectory Field had a capacity of around 7,000 - which was the largest recorded attendance when the Combined Services played the All Blacks on the 30 November 1993.

Up to present day 
As well as hosting the All Blacks, the early 1990s were a successful time for the club as they won back to back league titles by winning Devon League 1 in 1992, followed by Tribute Cornwall/Devon in 1993.  They spent four seasons in Western Counties West before being relegated in 1999.  In 2003 Devonport Services won promotion by winning the Tribute Cornwall/Devon for the second time.  Once again they enjoyed a number of seasons in Western Counties West until 2005 when a torrid season saw the go down in last place which just one league win all season.  This relegation was short-lived as Services came second in Tribute Devon/Cornwall to earn promotion back to Western Counties West.

Since 2005 the main stand (south stand) of the Rectory Field was closed due to safety concerns (it is made of wood and a fire hazard), leaving the current capacity at around 2,000 which includes the (still open) Luddington north stand and standing areas. The stand was named after MAA Bill Luddington who won 13 England caps while with the club.

In 2020–21 the South stand was demolished.

The Chairman. Captain Ben Stafford RN.

Secretary. WO1 Fraser Pearson RN.

Club captain; Charlie Rowlands-Stewart Esq.

Season 2021–22.

Ended the season in 2nd place to gain promotion to Regional 1 Tribute South West.

Season summary

Honours
Courage Devon 1 champions: 1991-92
Cornwall & Devon champions (2): 1992–93, 2002–03
Tribute Western Counties (north v west) promotion play-off winners: 2017–18

Representative honours

International
37 players have gained men's senior international caps whilst at Devonport Services including 97 caps for England.

England (14 players): Clarke.S, Eyres.W.C.T, Faithful.C.K.T, Gardener.E.R, Gilbert.F.G, Gilbert.R, Harding.E.H, Hosking.D'Arcy, Luddington.W.G.E, Moore.W.K.T, Sharp.R, Vaughan.D.B, Webb.C.S.H, Woods.T
Wales (14): D. Bebb, G. Bevan, J. Collins, T. Davies, C. James, B. Jones, L. Jones, D. Main, H. Mainwaring, A. Meredith, B. Meredith, M.C. Thomas, L. Williams, W. Williams
Ireland (3): W.F. Horsey-Brown, H.W.V. Stephenson, M. Sugden
Scotland (5): J. Aitkin, T. Rodd, K. Ross, G. Waddell, P. Waklastow
The Philippines: Liam 'Rufio' Williams.
Barbarians (7): M.C. Thomas, B. Gray, J. Highton, E. Hosking, SA. Lewis Jones, G. Waddell, J.K. Watkins

Youth internationals 
Twelve players have gained youth international caps while at Devonport Services.

England under 18s: Jack Arnott
England under 16s: R. Haddlington, N. Batchelor, S. Trethewey, J. Currie, Jack Arnott, Richard Bayliss, Dan Pullinger-Ham, Tom Mumford
England Colts: S. Trethewey, N. Batchelor
Scotland under 18s: S. Meakin

Men's county/representative
95 players have gained county or representative caps while at Devonport Services.

Devon (71): B. Badcock., C.A. Baker, S. Bennett, F.W. Bristow., Broome. Leading seaman, D. Brown, A.E. Carter, S. Clarke, M. Connolly., W.L. Copley, J.H. Dalyrymple, T.E. Davies, W. Davies, W.CT. Eyres, G. Fabian, E.J. Gardener, ERA. George, B.M. Gray., Sub-Lieut Hargrave, R. Hart., M. Hewitt, J. Highton., A. Higginson., R.M. Holgate.R.M., G.R. Hoskin, J. Husson, B. Jones, S. Jones, L. Kenny, J. Lane, K.A. Lavelle, T.S. Lee, Midshipman, W.M. Lowery, J. Martin, Meadows, A. Meredith, C. Miller, Lieutenant Middleditch, G. Morgan., J.K. Morrison., M.A. Pearey, B. Penfold, N. Penny, A. Pond, G. Price, F.A. Prosser, D. Pulford, G.D.O. Randel, Lieutenant Robotham, T.L. Scott, J. Shone, D.H. Smaldon, C.S. Stafford, L.S. Stovell, J.H. Tarr, D.G. Wixon
Devon 7's: Ben Ashford
Cornwall: Campbell, Lieutenant Carter, E.J. Gardener, F.G. Gilbert, Instructor Lieutenant B. Glastonbury, B.C. Gosling., S.J. Kealey, Lieutenant Kelly, Ldg Shiells, Instructor Lieutenant Thomas, Midshipman Walsham
Somerset: G. Criddle, H.W. Hoar
Surrey: J. Lion
Hampshire: M.J. Brosnan, T.G.P. Crick, B.G. Gosling, Lieutenant Mares
Dorset & Wilts: T. Hodgins
Berkshire: Lieutenant Fenner
Oxfordshire: Lieutenant Elvy
Kent (1): Coyte
Cumberland (1): Sub-Lieutenant Webster

Youth county/representative
11 players have gained youth county or representative caps while at Devonport Services.

Devon under 20s: M. Anstis, S. Bennett, Tom Arscott, J. Daley, L. Stannard, T. Wheale.

 Devon Under 18's, Richard Goldsby-West, Jordan Patey.

South West under 20s: Charlie Attis, Richard Baylis.
South West under 16s: Richard Bayliss, Dan Pullinger-Ham, Tom Mumford, Chalie Attis, Mike Lewis, Richard Goldsby-West.

Ladies international/representative
2 players have gained international or representative caps while at Devonport Services.
England: Lagi Tuima
England under 18s): Lagi Tuima, 
England under 20s : Jess Thomas. Lagi Tuima.
England Students (Ladies): Marcia Burgess

Notes

See also
 Devon RFU

References

External links
Devonport Services RFC
Devon RFU

English rugby union teams
Rugby clubs established in 1904
Military sport in the United Kingdom
Rugby union in Devon
Sport in Plymouth, Devon